Thomas Davies Mutch (17 October 1885 – 4 June 1958) was an Australian politician.

Early life
Born in London to busdriver William Murdoch Mutch and Sarah Davies, he arrived in New South Wales in 1887 and was educated at Double Bay Public School. He was subsequently a shearer for four years and joined the Australian Workers' Union, becoming a staff worker in 1903 and helping to found the Australian Writers and Artists Union in 1910. On 23 September 1912 he married Edith Marjorie Hasenham; he remarried on 26 March 1928 Dorothy Anette Joyce at Melbourne, with whom he had two children. From 1915 to 1916 he was New South Wales president and federal vice-president of the Australian Journalists' Association, and was convicted of incitement after the 1917 general strike.

Politics
He was an alderman at Mascot from 1923 to 1930 and Randwick from 1931 to 1937. Having been a member of the Australian Labor Party's central executive from 1913 to 1917, he was elected to the New South Wales Legislative Assembly in 1917 as the Labor member for Botany. He served as Minister of Public Instruction from 1921 to 1922 and Minister for Education from 1925 to 1927, when he was expelled from the New South Wales Labor Party as a leading opponent of Premier Jack Lang. Defeated as an Independent Labor candidate in 1927, he became a freelance journalist and in 1931 joined the fledgling United Australia Party. He returned to the Legislative Assembly in 1938 as the UAP member for Coogee, but resigned from the UAP and was defeated in 1941. Mutch died at Coogee in 1958.

His great-nephew Stephen Mutch was a state and federal Liberal MP.

References

 

1885 births
1958 deaths
United Australia Party members of the Parliament of New South Wales
Independent members of the Parliament of New South Wales
Members of the New South Wales Legislative Assembly
British emigrants to Australia
Australian Labor Party members of the Parliament of New South Wales
20th-century Australian politicians
20th-century Australian journalists